The Hungary women's national under-18 and under-19  is a national basketball team of Hungary and is governed by the Magyar Kosárlabdázók Országos Szövetsége.
It represents Hungary in international under-19 and under-18 (under age 19 and under age 18) women's basketball competitions.

See also
 Hungary women's national basketball team
 Hungary women's national under-17 basketball team
 Hungary men's national under-19 basketball team

References

under
Women's national under-19 basketball teams